Sfenj (from the Arabic word , meaning sponge) is a Maghrebi doughnut: a light, spongy ring of dough fried in oil. Sfenj is eaten plain, sprinkled with sugar, or soaked in honey. It is a well-known dish in the Maghreb and is traditionally made and sold early in the morning for breakfast or in the late afternoon accompanied by tea—usually Maghrebi mint tea—or coffee. The term sfenj is used in Algeria and other parts of the Maghreb. It is called bambalouni in Tunisia, and sfinz in Libya. In Morocco, the term "sfenj" is used, also sometimes nicknamed in the literature "Moroccan doughnuts". It is also called Khfaf or ftayr in Algeria, and is sometimes also dubbed as the "Algerian doughnut".

Outside the Maghreb, sfenj is often eaten by Moroccan Jews and other Sephardim  in Israel and elsewhere for Hanukkah. Sfenj and other doughnuts are eaten for Hanukkah because they are fried in oil, commemorating the Hanukkah miracle wherein the oil that was supposed to light the lamp in the Temple in Jerusalem for only one day lasted for eight. Though sfenj can be made at home, Moroccans almost always opt to purchase it from street vendors or bakeries, where they are commonly strung on palm fronds.

History
Sfenj originated in Al-Andalus (Moorish Spain). According to legend, sfenj was created by mistake, when a baker accidentally dropped a ball of dough into a pan of hot oil. Sfenj was an important part of Andalusi culture, whose role was best summarised by a verse from a contemporary poet: "The sfenj bakers are worth as much as kings" ("").

It is unclear how sfenj first spread to the Maghreb, although it is said to have been well known to the Marinid Dynasty, which ruled Morocco from 1270 to 1465. It spread to France during the 13th century, where it inspired beignets. Sfenj were only sweetened with sugar starting in the 18th century, even though sugarcane has been widely cultivated in the Arab world since the 8th century. Before that, they were sweetened with honey or syrup, or simply served plain.

Although sfenj comes from Al-Andalus, most bakers and sellers of sfenj in the Maghreb have traditionally been Amazigh (Berbers). The nomadic Amazigh are thought to have spread sfenj throughout the Maghreb aided in that by merchants who traveled across the region.

Dedicated sfenj bakers, called sufnāj, soon appeared throughout the Maghreb, attesting to the dessert's popularity. Sufnājeen (plural of sufnāj) became central figures in the social life of Maghrebi neighborhoods, as they interacted with almost every household in their community every morning, and working as a sufnāj was considered a respectable career. In a traditional sfenj bakery, the sufnāj (and their large circular fryer) sit on an elevated platform, raised slightly above the rest of the bakery, which is already raised more than a meter off the ground. Customers surround this platform and try to catch the sufnāj's attention to place their orders by raising their hand at him or her and shouting.

Traditional sufnājeen are quickly going extinct in the modern Maghreb, as a result of the rise of industrial bakeries and the proliferation of sfenj recipes over the Internet blogosphere.

Sfinz in Libya

In Libya Sfinz is eaten sprinkled with sugar or soaked in honey or date molasses. It can be eaten for Friday breakfast or with afternoon tea. Though it is eaten year-round, it is especially popular during the winter months and around Ramadan and Eid al-Fitr. It is the Libyan version of the sfenj doughnuts that are widely popular across the other countries of the Maghreb.

Sfinz can also be prepared with a fried egg in the center. The egg can be runny or hard, and is often topped with cheese.

Sfenj in Israel

Sfenj entered Israeli culture before 1948, as Maghrebi Jews brought it with them when they immigrated to Mandatory Palestine. Sfenj quickly became popular for Hanukkah, as it is easy to prepare at home. However, sfenj's ease of preparation contributed to its loss of popularity in Israel when the Histadrut, Israel's national labor union, pushed to make the jelly-filled sufganiyah the traditional food of Hanukkah, during the late 1920s. Making sufganiyot well can only be done by professional bakers, and the Histadrut wanted sufganiyot to supplant the home-made latkes in order to secure jobs for Jewish bakers. Their effort was successful: by 2016, Israel's 7 million Jews were eating 20 million sufganiyot per year. More Israeli Jews report eating sufganiyot for Hanukkah than fasting for Yom Kippur.

Varieties
In addition to ordinary sfenj, there are two special varieties of sfenj, not counting the different toppings (honey, syrup, and sugar) sfenj can have:
Sfenj matifiyya, sfenj that is pounded flat and then fried a second time
Sfenj matifiyya bil-baydh, sfenj matifiyya with an egg added before refrying

In language
Sfenj's importance to Moroccan culture is reflected in several idioms in Moroccan Arabic, including:
"Give someone a sfenj and he'll say it's ugly", meaning "do not judge a book by its cover" or "do not bite the hand that feeds you."
"As if hitting a dog with a sfenj", meaning a futile or Sisyphean endeavor, especially an act of pointless petty revenge (because if someone hits a dog with a sfenj, the dog will eat and like it).
"Demanding oil from a sufnāj", meaning "taking from the needy" (because a sufnāj—a sfenj baker—uses large amounts of cooking oil).

Gallery

See also

Moroccan cuisine
Arab cuisine
Buñuelo, the Latin American equivalent
Frittelle, the Italian equivalent
List of doughnut varieties
List of Moroccan dishes
List of Middle Eastern dishes
Sufganiyah
Zalabiyeh

References

External links
Sfinz/sfenj recipe
Sfinz recipe from the Libyan Observer

 

Doughnuts
Arab desserts
Algerian cuisine
Moroccan cuisine
Israeli desserts
Hanukkah foods
Street food